Miss Teen USA 2005, the 23rd Miss Teen USA pageant, was held on August 8, 2005, at Baton Rouge River Center, Baton Rouge, Louisiana. Allie LaForce of Ohio was crowned by Shelley Hennig of Louisiana.

Prior to the live telecast, the 51 contestants competed in a preliminary presentation show where they were judged in swimsuits and evening gowns. Scores from this judging determined the top 15 for the final competition.

All the delegates were first to required to win their state pageant, which in some states also meant holding a local title.

Results

Placements

Special Awards
Miss Congeniality: Rachel Woolard (Missouri)
Miss Photogenic: Latasha Lawrie (Kansas)

Delegates
The Miss Teen USA 2005 delegates are:

Judges
Kathy Hilton
Shane McRae
Lou Pearlman

References

External links
Official website

http://pageantcenter.com/pageants1/pageant-news/miss-teen-usa-pageant-announces-2005-panel-of-judges/#.Vio3itKrSUl
http://www.allielaforce.com/miss-teen-usa.htm
http://www.prnewswire.com/news-releases/kathy-hilton-and-covergirl-spokesmodel-naima-mora-headline-celebrity-judging-panel-for-nbcs-miss-teen-usar-live-from-baton-rouge-louisiana-august-8-9-11pm-et-54827142.html

2005
2005 beauty pageants
2005 in the United States
2005 in Louisiana